Choristoceratoidea, formerly Choristocerataceae, is a superfamily of Late Triassic ceratitidan ammonites. They can be characterized by their simple, four-lobed suture lines and unusual heteromorph shell shapes, which can resemble straight rods or twisting cones rather than the flat coils typical of other ammonites. The shells are usually small (less than 3 cm long) and ornamented with prominent ribbing.

References 

Ceratitida superfamilies
Late Triassic first appearances
Late Triassic extinctions